Aslanbech Qeytuqo was the Kabardian Grand Prince between 1737 and 1746. He was the eldest son of Prince Qeytuqo Djembulatiqo. His younger brothers were Qanamet and Djembulat.

He believed that the struggles between princes, lords and khans must end and the unity of the tribes should be ensured in order to gather first Kabarda and then the whole Caucasus under a state roof. He gained the support of Jabagh Qazanoqo.

References 

 Мальбахов Б. К. "Кабарда на этапах политической истории (середина XVI — первая четверть XIX века), Москва, «Поматур», 2002 г. 

1746 deaths